Vermafossen or Vermefossen is a waterfall in Rauma Municipality in Møre og Romsdal county, Norway.  The waterfall is on the river Verma which is a tributary to the large river Rauma which flows through the Romsdalen valley.  The waterfall is near the village of Verma as well as the Rauma railway line and the European route E136.

The river Verma flows in steep cascades, splits in three canals, and finally drops about  into the main river. In the world waterfall database it is listed as the 242nd tallest in the world. The valley of the Verma river is a typical "hook-valley" (agnordal) as Verma river in prehistory was a tributary to Gudbrandsdalslågen to the east. As the Rauma river gradually dug into the bedrock in upper Romsdalen valley the watershed shifted east and Verma river was captured by Rauma river. Hans Reusch described this peculiarity of the Scandinavian divide in 1905. The hook-valley phenomenon is particularly visible around the Romsdalen/Eikesdalen and northern Gudbrandsdalen.

The flow of the Verma river is regulated by dams and used at the Verma power station (originally built in 1923, expanded in 1953). About  are produced annually.

References

Waterfalls of Møre og Romsdal
Rauma, Norway